The Spirit of the Outback is a long-distance passenger rail service in Queensland, Australia, operated by Queensland Rail's Traveltrain division.

Route
Debuting in November 1993 by combining the former Capricornian and Midlander trains, this 1,325 km rail journey operates between Brisbane and Longreach. The Spirit of the Outback travels along the east coast of Queensland, from Brisbane to Rockhampton, where it heads west through Blackwater, Emerald and Barcaldine, to Longreach. 

The Spirit of the Outback passes through coastal landscapes and then travels into the Outback, through mountain ranges, sunburnt plains and historic towns and to attractions such as the Australian Stockman's Hall of Fame and Qantas Founders Outback Museum. The train operates twice weekly. In January 2015, the service was upgraded with refurbished L series carriages. At this time the M series carriages and Motorail services were also withdrawn. While the Tuckerbox was retained, the Stockman's Bar and Captain Starlight Lounge (which were the original lounge cars) were withdrawn and since replaced with the Shearer's Rest Lounge.

Classes of travel
The Spirit of the Outback has three classes of travel:

Economy seats
Economy single sleepers (Currently not available due to rolling stock maintenance)
First class sleeping berths:

'First Class Single Sleeper' , with a seat and fold-down bed
'First Class Twin Sleeper' , with two seats that convert into two lower single beds.

Incident with coal train
On 18 November 2000, 3W56 Longreach-bound Spirit of the Outback came within 50 metres of colliding head-on with a Gladstone-bound coal train.  The close call occurred 15 kilometres west of Dingo when the coal train proceeded through a red signal and entered the same section of track the Spirit of the Outback was travelling on.  At the time of the incident, there were fifty passengers on board the Spirit of the Outback.  When the crew of the coal train realised the danger, they applied their emergency brakes and contacted the crew of the Spirit of the Outback who also applied their emergency brakes.  Both trains were able to stop in time before a head on collision occurred. The "Spirit" came to a stop first and the drivers vacated the lead locomotive as the coal train approached. There was much criticism that the drivers had abandoned the passengers with no warning to brace for an impending impact.  The Spirit of the Outback was hauled back to Dingo where passengers were permitted to disembark and were given complimentary tea and coffee.  The Spirit of the Outback was delayed for two and a half hours due to the incident.

A Blackwater woman who was on board the Spirit of the Outback told a local newspaper that passengers were not given any details about what had happened or told why the train had returned to Dingo.  She said she only realised the severity of what had occurred when she saw the incident reported on the television news that night.

An investigation chaired by Queensland Transport concluded on 8 December 2000, which confirmed the crew of the coal train were at fault because they had passed a signal at danger and as a result were facing disciplinary action.  A Queensland Rail spokesperson said the two drivers, who had excellent driving records prior to the incident, would undergo extensive re-training before being allowed to return to driving duties.  The spokesperson also said the staff on board the Spirit of the Outback had acted properly by not discussing the severity of the incident with passengers at the time.

Today 
The Spirit of the Outback is a popular service used by thousands of passengers each year despite its ageing rolling stock.

On the 16 June 2021, the Queensland State Government announced ”$1 million for a business case to build replacement carriages for the iconic Westlander, Inlander and Spirit of the Outback long-distance services right here in Queensland.”

References

External links
Queensland Rail Travel website

Named passenger trains of Queensland
Night trains of Australia
Railway services introduced in 1993
1993 establishments in Australia
Australian outback
Motorail